Vashian-e Cheshmeh Shirin (also Romanized as Vāshīān-e Cheshmeh Shīrīn; also known as Cheshmeh Shīrīn-e Vāshīān) is a village in Miyankuh-e Gharbi Rural District, in the Central District of Pol-e Dokhtar County, Lorestan Province, Iran. At the 2006 census, its population was 341, in 71 families.

References 

Towns and villages in Pol-e Dokhtar County